Ilya Vladimirovich Mokretsov (sometimes spelled Mokretcov, ; born 17 April 1984, in Kazan) is a male sabre fencer who first represented Russia then Kazakhstan.

Career
Mokretsov took up fencing at age twelve after coach Lev Belusov scouted him at the ice rink. In 2000 he joined the Russian junior national team, which became team world champions in 2002. At the Junior World Championships he earned an individual silver medal in 2004. The next year, at the 2005 Summer Universiade in İzmir, he joined as a reserve a Russian team made up of experienced fencers Aleksey Frosin, Aleksey Yakimenko and Aleksey Dyachenko, who won the team gold medal.

His senior career proved less successful. He was called into the Russian national team only in 2009 and 2010, after the retirement of Stanislav Pozdnyakov, but he never made it onto the podium: Russia ranked fourth both at the 2009 World Championships and the 2010 European Championships.

During the 2012–13 season, he took the Kazakhstani citizenship. Under his new colours, he won a team bronze medal at the 2013 and 2015 Asian Championships. In 2016 he qualified to the 2016 Summer Olympics with a top three finish at the Prague pre-olympic tournament.

References

External links
 
 
 
  (archive)
  (archive)
 

1984 births
Living people
Russian male sabre fencers
Kazakhstani male sabre fencers
Fencers at the 2016 Summer Olympics
Olympic fencers of Kazakhstan
Fencers at the 2018 Asian Games
Asian Games competitors for Kazakhstan